Mycobacterium intermedium is a species of the phylum Actinomycetota (Gram-positive bacteria with high guanine and cytosine content, one of the dominant phyla of all bacteria), belonging to the genus Mycobacterium.

Etymology: Latin; intermedium, meaning between, rapidly and slowly growing mycobacteria.

Description
Gram-positive, and nonmotile acid-fast coccobacilli (2.0 µm x 2.6 µm).

Colony characteristics
Eugonic, smooth and photochromogenic colonies (3–5mm in diameter) on Löwenstein-Jensen medium.

Physiology
Growth on Löwenstein-Jensen medium at 22 °C, 31 °C, 37 °C and 41 °C, (optimal temperature between 31 °C and 37 °C), within 2–3 weeks.
Susceptible to ethambutol and rifampin.
Resistant to isoniazid and streptomycin.

Differential characteristics
Phylogenetic position between rapidly and slowly growing mycobacteria.
M. asiaticum is phenotypically very similar, but can be distinguished by its growth at 22 °C, and by its dysgonic growth.

Pathogenesis
Pulmonary disease
Biosafety level 2

Type strain
Repeatedly isolated from sputum from a patient with pulmonary disease.
Strain 1669/91 = ATCC 51848 = CCUG 37583 = CIP 104542 = DSM 44049 = JCM 13572

References

Meier et al. 1993.  Mycobacterium intermedium sp. nov. Int. J. Syst. Bacteriol., 1993, 43, 204–209.

External links
Type strain of Mycobacterium intermedium at BacDive -  the Bacterial Diversity Metadatabase

Acid-fast bacilli
intermedium
Bacteria described in 1993